In mycology a tissue or feature is said to be amyloid if it has a positive amyloid reaction when subjected to a crude chemical test using iodine as an ingredient of either Melzer's reagent or Lugol's solution, producing a blue to blue-black staining. The term "amyloid" is derived from the Latin amyloideus ("starch-like"). It refers to the fact that starch gives a similar reaction, also called an amyloid reaction. The test can be on microscopic features, such as spore walls or hyphal walls, or the apical apparatus or entire ascus wall of an ascus, or be a macroscopic reaction on tissue where a drop of the reagent is applied. Negative reactions, called inamyloid or nonamyloid, are for structures that remain pale yellow-brown or clear. A reaction producing a deep reddish to reddish-brown staining is either termed a dextrinoid reaction (pseudoamyloid is a synonym) or a hemiamyloid reaction.

Melzer's reagent reactions

Hemiamyloidity
Hemiamyloidity in mycology refers to a special case of cell wall amyloidity where the blue staining by iodine only occurs when the tissue was pretreated with potassium hydroxide solution (KOH) or other strong bases, whereas direct application of iodine causes a red reaction when using Lugol's solution, but no reaction when using Melzer's reagent. Hemiamyloidity is so far only known in Ascomycota, but here widespread and an important taxonomic distinction criterion.  If cell walls stain blue by iodine reagents without pretreatment with KOH, this is called euamyloid. The term amyloid comprises both variants.

Properties
A hemiamyloid element of the cell wall does not directly stain blue with iodine reagents added to a water preparation, but only when it has been pretreated with potassium hydroxide solution (KOH). Without KOH pretreatment, the result depends much on the type of iodine reagent: with Lugol's solution (IKI), hemiamyloid structures react red to reddish-brown, whereas any reaction is suppressed when using Melzer's reagent (MLZ). This masking effect (false inamyloidity) is due to the high chloral hydrate concentration in MLZ. The alternative to hemiamyloid is called euamyloid. Euamyloid and KOH-pretreated hemiamyloid structures react blue regardless of the type of iodine reagent. Hemiamyloid and euamyloid reactions may occur at a time, either at spatially separated sites of the cell wall (e.g., ascus apical ring euamyloid, lateral wall hemiamyloid), or as an intermediate type of the same wall region. In the latter case, an overlay of blue and red can be observed in Lugol's solution without KOH pretreatment: a color change from blue to dirty reddish-brown occurs when the iodine reagent slowly diffuses into the water preparation, because the euamyloid reaction appears at lower iodine concentrations than the hemiamyloid reaction. Asci with entirely reactive walls of this type of hemiamyloidity show rainbow-like colours when low-concentrated IKI is applied.

		

Hemiamyloid (red) reaction in IKI prior to KOH, in comparison with euamyloid (blue) and inamyloid (negative). Only the hemiamyloid reaction strongly depends on the applied iodine reagent (IKI, MLZ) and pretreatment with KOH, being negative in MLZ and blue when KOH-pretreated (in IKI or MLZ).  Direct application of IKI to a water munt (without KOH, highlighted) is the easiest way to recognize hemiamyloidity.

Iodine reaction of hemiamyloid ascus apical rings of Hysteropezizella (Helotiales) in dependence of iodine reagent (IKI, MLZ) and pretreatment with KOH.

Occurrence, significance
Hemiamyloidity occurs in many groups of ascomycetes. In most members of Lecanorales and Ostropales, whether lichenized or not, the entire outer ascus wall layer reacts hemiamyloid. Roughly 20% of Helotiales have hemiamyloid] ascus apical rings compared to estimated 50% with euamyloid apical rings. In Pezizomycetes and different classes of pyrenomycetes hemiamyloid reactions are rare. Although hemiamyloidity is a very valuable taxonomic marker that permits differentiation between species or genera, this type of reaction, in particular the red reaction in IKI, is often overlooked. This neglect occurred since mycologists switched to Melzer's reagent, which was introduced in 1924 and almost completely displaced the previously used Lugol's solution.  Hemiamyloidity was first reported by applying Melzer's reagent which gave a negative result without KOH, but a blue reaction when treated with KOH beforehand.  Because of the frequency of hemiamyloidity in lichens, lichenologists generally did not join this change but continued using Lugol's solution. The widespread usage of swelling herborized fungi in KOH before study further contributes to the frequent overlooking of hemiamyloidity.

Chemistry
The chemical background of hemiamyloidity is not clear. A hypothesis claims that short helical sections of a carbohydrate chain alternate with shorter or longer linear sections. The short helical sections, similar to dextrinoidity of glycogen, would cause the red reaction by inclusion of iodine atoms into the spiral, and the linear sections might curl up under the influence of KOH, resulting in long helical chains which cause a blue stain upon iodine inclusion. The hypothetical spiral structure of these macromolecules seems to be related to the extensibility of the ascus wall, which is a prerequisite for the active, explosive ejection of ascospores from an ascus when its high cell turgor is released. A high cell wall extensibility is particularly required at the area of the apical pore-like opening (apical ring), through which the ascospores are pressed when the ascus bursts.

See also
 Color reaction
 Iodine test

References

Mycology

ru:Споровый порошок#Исследование на амилоидность